William Keri Jones (born 13 January 1945) is a Welsh dual-code international rugby union, and professional rugby league footballer who played in the 1960s and 1970s. He was also an accomplished track and field athlete having represented Wales at the 1966 Jamaica Commonwealth Games.

Background
Keri Jones was born in Neath, Wales.

International honours (Rugby union)
Keri Jones won 5-caps for Wales (RU) while at Cardiff RFC. Jones was capped five times as a wing for Wales, winning all his caps in the 1967-68 season. He scored two tries for Wales. Jones was selected for the 1968 British Lions tour to South Africa but did not play in any of the internationals against . He did play in the match against Rhodesia, and in five other games against regional opposition, scoring a try in the win over South Western Districts.

International honours (Rugby league)
Keri Jones won caps for Great Britain (RL) while at Wigan in the 1970 Rugby League World Cup against France, and New Zealand.

References

External links
!Great Britain Statistics at englandrl.co.uk (statistics currently missing due to not having appeared for both Great Britain, and England)
Statistics at wigan.rlfans.com
On This Day at Scrum.com
Statistics at Scrum.com

1945 births
Living people
Barbarian F.C. players
British & Irish Lions rugby union players from Wales
Cardiff Metropolitan University RFC players
Cardiff RFC players
Dual-code rugby internationals
Great Britain national rugby league team players
Neath RFC players
Rugby league players from Neath
Rugby league wingers
Rugby union players from Neath
Rugby union wings
Wales international rugby union players
Welsh rugby league players
Welsh rugby union players
Wigan Warriors players